is a Japanese football player who plays for SC Sagamihara.

Club statistics
Updated to 26 December 2017.

References

External links

Profile at JEF United Chiba

1986 births
Living people
Association football people from Kanagawa Prefecture
Japanese footballers
J1 League players
J2 League players
J3 League players
Vissel Kobe players
Cerezo Osaka players
Sagan Tosu players
JEF United Chiba players
Kagoshima United FC players
SC Sagamihara players
Association football defenders